Oophaga andresi, also known as the cocorro, is a species of poison dart frog. It was described in 2018.

References

andresi
Amphibians described in 2018
Frogs of South America
Amphibians of Colombia